Penicillium argentinense is a fungus species of the genus of Penicillium.

See also
List of Penicillium species

References

argentinense
Fungi described in 2011